Richardo "Chardo" Israel (born 9 September 1991) is a Jamaican footballer who plays as a defender for Stumptown Athletic in the NISA.

Career

College & Amateur
Israel began playing college soccer at the University of Cincinnati in 2012, where he played for three seasons.

Following college, Israel appeared for USL PDL sides GPS Portland Phoenix and the Ocean City Nor'easters.

Professional
In September 2019, Israel signed for NISA side Stumptown Athletic ahead of the league's inaugural season.

References

External links
 Profile at University of Cincinnati Athletics
 Stumptown Athletic profile

1991 births
Living people
Jamaican footballers
Association football defenders
Cincinnati Bearcats men's soccer players
GPS Portland Phoenix players
Ocean City Nor'easters players
Stumptown AC players
USL League Two players
National Independent Soccer Association players
Cincinnati Kings players
Jamaican expatriate footballers
Expatriate soccer players in the United States
Jamaican expatriate sportspeople in the United States